Mohammad Aqa-ye Olya (also Romanized as Moḩammad Āqā-ye ‘Olyā; also known as Moḩammadābād) is a village in Baba Jik Rural District, in the Central District of Chaldoran County, West Azerbaijan Province, Iran. At the 2006 census, its population was 27, in 5 families.

References 

Populated places in Chaldoran County